Susunia refers a hill in West Bengal, India

It can also refer to:
Susunia, Purulia, a village in West Bengal, India